Keith Bailey (born 7 October 1961) is a Canadian retired professional soccer player.

Early life and youth years
Keith Bailey was born in Toronto, Ontario to English parents. When he was six months old his family returned to England, to a rural part of West Yorkshire. It was there, more than a decade later, that scouts first took notice. In 1977 Bailey was chosen to play on several local and district select teams. In 1978 at age 16 he signed with Fourth Division club, Bradford City A.F.C. and even made several first team appearances with them.

NASL career
Bailey's aunt and uncle, Ann and Norman Bailey, lived in St. Petersburg, Florida at that time. Through sheer persistence they were able to persuade the North American Soccer League side Tampa Bay Rowdies to grant their nephew a tryout of sorts, while he was visiting them on holiday in May 1980. Impressed by what he saw, Rowdies’ coach Gordon Jago signed Bailey to a three-year contract in early June. Two weeks later he collected an assist in his first ever league match, a start for Tampa Bay at Minnesota Kicks, and scored a goal in his third NASL appearance, coming on as a substitute.

His promising NASL start was abruptly cut short after breaking both his left tibia and fibula during a training ground collision on August 7. The compound fracture and subsequent rehab forced him to miss the remainder of the 1980 season and playoffs as well as the entire 1980–81 indoor season. He came back to make fourteen appearances in 1981 and another seven in the 1981–82 indoor season. The Rowdies released him in March 1982. He spent the summer of 1982 with Tampa Bay's reserve team, Rowdies II. He later returned to West Yorkshire and played at Steeton A.F.C. before retiring.

Honors
North American Soccer League
1981–82 indoor: Finalist

References

External links
NASL stats

1961 births
Living people
Association football forwards
Canadian soccer players
Canadian expatriate soccer players
Soccer players from Toronto
English Football League players
Bradford City A.F.C. players
Steeton A.F.C. players
North American Soccer League (1968–1984) players
North American Soccer League (1968–1984) indoor players
Tampa Bay Rowdies (1975–1993) players